The 1971 German Grand Prix was a Formula One motor race held at Nürburgring on 1 August 1971. It was race 7 of 11 in both the 1971 World Championship of Drivers and the 1971 International Cup for Formula One Manufacturers.

The race returned to the Nürburgring after a year at the Hockenheimring after the safety was improved on the track. The race distance was shortened to 12 laps. Notable driver changes included Vic Elford replacing Pedro Rodríguez, who had been killed in a sports car race at Norisring the previous month. Jackie Stewart took pole and dominated the race, while François Cevert finished second, making it a Tyrrell 1-2. Cevert battled with and was stuck behind Clay Regazzoni for more than a quarter of the race; the Swiss driver finished 3rd. Mario Andretti, Ronnie Peterson and Tim Schenken rounded out the points. Mike Beuttler was disqualified on the third lap after entering the pits via the "short chute", after suffering a flat tire just after passing the pits, and not wanting to drive 14 miles on a flat tire. Jo Siffert was also disqualified on lap seven for taking the short chute into the pits, after his right-hand lower front wishbone started detaching from the chassis and his ignition coil started acting up. With a lap distance  of 12 laps the race formerly held the record for the fewest number of laps (official) in a Grand Prix until the 2021 Belgian Grand Prix which was classified after 1 lap after being red flagged.

Classification

Qualifying

Race

Championship standings after the race

Drivers' Championship standings

Constructors' Championship standings

Note: Only the top five positions are included for both sets of standings.

References

External links

German Grand Prix
German Grand Prix
German Grand Prix
Sport in Rhineland-Palatinate